United Nations Security Council Resolution 337, adopted unanimously on August 15, 1973, condemned the state of Israel for forcibly diverting and then seizing a Lebanese airline from Lebanon's airspace.  The Council considered these actions a violation of the relevant 1949 Armistice Agreements, the cease-fire resolution of the Security Council of 1967, the provisions of the Charter, the international conventions on civil aviation and the very principles of international law and morality.

The Resolution goes on to call upon the International Civil Aviation Organization to consider adequate measures to safeguard civil aviation and for Israel to desist from any further attacks that would violate Lebanon's sovereignty and territorial civil aviation.  The Council stated that if Israel repeated similar acts they would consider taking adequate steps to enforce their resolutions.

See also
 Israeli–Lebanese conflict
 List of United Nations Security Council Resolutions 301 to 400 (1971–1976)

References
Text of the Resolution at undocs.org

External links
 

 0337
 0337
Arab–Israeli peace process
1973 in Israel
1973 in Lebanon
 0337
August 1973 events